The following is a list of football stadiums in Greece, ordered by capacity.

Current stadiums

Proposed stadiums

See also
List of European stadiums by capacity
List of association football stadiums by capacity

References

 
Greece
stadiums
Stadiums